Isusumbong Kita sa Tatay Ko... is a 1999 Philippine action comedy film directed by Boots Plata and starring Fernando Poe Jr. and Judy Ann Santos. The film, produced and distributed by Star Cinema, premiered in the Philippines on June 9, 1999.

It is also FPJ's first and only film under Star Cinema.

Synopsis
"Badong (FPJ) has been raising up his only child, Joey, ever since his wife died at an early age. Consequently, Joey grows up like her father, a boyish person who acts like a man. Together with Lola Benedicta (Anita Linda), Badong and Joey had been living happily, with the former protecting his child while the latter is helping his father with his auto repair shop. One day, Badong's childhood friend, Beth (Aileen Damiles), visits their location and they became close. However, Joey feels that Beth is trying to replace her late mother and that Beth is destroying her relationship with her father.

Cast
Fernando Poe Jr. as Badong Rivera
Judy Ann Santos as Josephine "Joey" Rivera
Aileen Damiles	as Beth
Anita Linda as Lola Benedicta
Paquito Díaz as Sarge
Kier Legazpí as Archie
Berting Labra as Mang Cosme
Leandro Muñoz as Caloy
Robert Arevalo as Alfredo
Angel Aquino as Alicia Rivera
Kathleen Hermosa as Jenny
Ama Quiambao as Beth's aunt
Gerald Ejército as Archie's friend
RG Gutiérrez as Archie's friend
Gian Achacoso as Archie's friend
Jaypee Plata as Archie's friend
Anne Lorraine as Archie's friend
Sharon Malapitan as Archie's friend
Lovely Mansueto as Archie's friend
Mar Garchitorena as Congressman
Telly Babasa as Market Goon
Ding Alvaro as Market Goon
Jhun Melan as Market Goon
Mack Gomez as Market Goon
Juan Ramírez as Market Goon
Dardo de Oro as Market Goon
Rey Comia as Market Goon
Bert Garon as Archie's Men
Ernie Madriaga as Archie's Men
Boy Dalanon as Archie's Men
Baby Malanes as Talyer Worker
Tom Alvarez as Talyer Worker
Bernie Garcia as Talyer Worker
Rey Abella as Talyer Worker
Ed Madriaga as Talyer Worker
Butch Achacoso as Brgy. Chairman
Gary Manansala as Kagawad
Maria Gonzales as Nurse
Mon Fernandez as Policeman
Raynald Laranjo as Policeman
Celso Balte as Policeman
Tony Gahuman as Policeman
Polly Cadsawan as Congressman's Bodyguard
Ali Leal as Painted Man
Ronnie Paronie as Painted Man
Raymond Alonzo as Painted Man
Boy Surposa as Painted Man
Jun Medraza as Painted Man
Rey Abella as Painted Man
Harry Villa as Painted Man
Eric Fresnido as Painted Man
Robert Sanchez as Painted Man
Caloy Alcantara as Guitarist

Production
The production team started filming during the first week of April 1999. During this time, Poe Jr. revealed that his first project with Santos under Star Cinema was first planned in 1997.

However, the team encountered problems with the production fees. Because of substantial cost-cutting over the years, talent fees of the stars/cast had to be reduced.

The film was Muñoz' first film project in the entertainment industry. He was, at the time, the current "Close-Up Boy" and was part of the eighth batch of ABS-CBN's Star Circle. On the other hand, his co-star, Santos, was thrilled to be her partner since they were former schoolmates in real life at Mt. Carmel High School in Quezon City.

Music
The theme song of the film is entitled "Awitin Mo At Isasayaw Ko", which was written by Joey De Leon and Vic Sotto of VST & Co., and performed by the stars Fernando Poe Jr. and Judy Ann Santos. It also features Rey Valera's song "Kung Tayo'y Magkakalayo" , performed by Valera himself albeit with modified lyrics by Vehnee Saturno to better reflect the movie's theme of father and daughter relationship. Also used in the film was April Boy Regino's "Di Ko Kayang Tanggapin" performed by Leandro Muñoz.

Reception

Box-office
Isusumbong Kita Sa Tatay Ko marked the first Philippine-produced film to have reached and exceeded  in box office gross.

Consequently, the film's box office performance earned both Poe Jr. and Santos the titles "Box Office King and Queen" by the Guillermo Mendoza Memorial Scholarship Foundation.

Critical response
The film received predominantly favorable reviews besides its commercial success. For instance, Sol Jose Vanzi of the Philippine Headline News Online noted, "It's a match produced in celluloid heaven, because he [Poe Jr.] is [the] king of Philippine movies while she [Santos] is considered today's drama princess."

Awards

Planned sequel
A few weeks after its release, the production team was already planning for a possible sequel. The following year, plans for the sequel was brought up by Poe a couple of times. He mentioned that a script was being worked on but he was not satisfied with the results, adding that the draft at the time felt forced. The sequel would have carried the title "Magpaalam Ka Muna sa Tatay Ko" and would have featured a different storyline.

Santos then revealed that the sequel would have reunited her with her "Gimik" leading man, Rico Yan. According to Santos, Poe himself wanted Yan to become part of the sequel.

The plans never came to fruition as Yan died in 2002, followed by Poe himself in 2004.

References

External links

1999 films
Filipino-language films
Philippine comedy films
Star Cinema films
Tagalog-language films
1990s English-language films